The FIVB Volleyball Men's U21 World Championship, called the FIVB Volleyball Men's Junior World Championship between 2007 and 2011, is the world championship of volleyball for male players under the age of 21 organized by Fédération Internationale de Volleyball (FIVB).

The first edition was staged in 1977 in Brazil and tournaments have been played every four years for the first three editions and every two years since then. The most recent tournament was hosted by Bahrain in the city of Manama and won by Iran.

Russia is the most successful nation in the tournament's history, with six titles and three runners-up. Brazil is the second most successful with four titles and six runners-up.

A corresponding tournament for female players is the FIVB Volleyball Women's U21 World Championship.

Results summary

Medal table

Appearance

Legend
 – Champions
 – Runners-up
 – Third place
 – Fourth place
 – Did not enter / Did not qualify
 – Hosts
Q – Qualified for forthcoming tournament

MVP by edition

1977–93 – Not awarded
1995 – 
1997 – Not awarded
1999 – 
2001 – 
2003 – Not awarded
2005 – 
2007 – 

2009 – 
2011 – 
2013 – 
2015 – 
2017 – 
2019 – 
2021 –

See also

FIVB Volleyball Women's U20 World Championship
FIVB Volleyball Men's World Championship
FIVB Volleyball Men's U23 World Championship
FIVB Volleyball Boys' U19 World Championship

References

External links
FIVB Men's Junior Volleyball World Championship Honours

 
International men's volleyball competitions
Youth volleyball
Volleyball
Biennial sporting events
Recurring sporting events established in 1977